Grigorievca is a village in Căușeni District, Moldova. It is located 106 meters above sea level.

References

Villages of Căușeni District